Hanumant Shankar Sawant (born 13 August 1939) is a radio astronomer and one of the pioneers of the Brazilian solar radio astronomy. He has been the key scientist behind concept, design and installation of the Brazilian Decimetric Array (BDA). Under his leadership, an outstanding group in radio astrophysics has been built at National Institute of Space Research (INPE) in Brazil.

Early life and education 
Hanumant Sawant was born at Pune, India in 1939. He received BSc degree in Electronics and Communications Engineering from University of Bombay in 1964 and MSc in Physics in 1971 from the Ahmedabad University, and PhD in Physical Sciences from Physical Research Laboratory (PRL) in 1977. He was at the Department of Astronomy of University of Maryland (1978–1979) and Space Science Laboratory of University of California, Berkeley, USA (1980–1981). In 1982, he became Associate Researcher of the National Institute for Space Research (INPE) in Brazil. He became Project Director of the BDA in 2002 and retired from INPE in 2015.

Major Contributions 
His main contributions involved observational and theoretical precursor studies of fine structures in solar noise storms at decametric frequencies and high-energy solar flares, in collaboration with leading scientists such as R.V. Bhonsle,  S.K. Alurkar, S.S. Degaonkar, M. Kundu, P. Kaufmann and S.R. Kane. In 1982 he participated in the innovative investigation on the interplanetary effects of solar flares occurred in 1979 when after, in 1984, he published the results  in partnership with S.R. Kane and A. Hewish the Nobel Prize winner in physics in 1974. This was pioneering work in the scientific field that is now known as the space weather.

He was the main researcher for the development of the following instruments in solar radio astronomy: ROI Millimeter Radiometer (18–23 GHz) - Itapetinga Radio Observatory (Atibaia, SP), Decimetric Solar Spectrometer (1.2-1.7 GHz), Brazilian Solar Spectroscope (BSS) (1.0-2.5 GHz) and Brazilian Decimetric Array (BDA), for which he has served as General Coordinator since 2001.

Personal life 
Prof. Hanumant Sawant  is married to Ratna Sawant and resides in São José dos Campos, state of São Paulo, Brazil. He has one daughter, Vidula Sawant and one son. His son, Abhijit Sawant is married to Sandra. He is the grandfather of Kyle, Enzo and Enya.

References

External links 
 2010 Brazilian Decimetric Array (BDA)

1939 births
Living people
Brazilian astronomers
Fergusson College alumni
Radio astronomers
University of Mumbai alumni
People from Pune